Elizabeth "Libby" Locke is an American lawyer. She specializes in defamation cases. Together with her husband Tom Clare she owns the law firm Clare Locke.

Career 
Locke is married to fellow lawyer Tom Clare and together they run the law firm Clare Locke LLP. They founded Clare Locke in 2014 after leaving Kirkland & Ellis LLP and each own half of the company. Clare Locke specializes in reputation based cases, especially defamation.

In 2016 Locke represented a University of Virginia administrator against Rolling Stone magazine in a case resulting from the article A Rape on Campus.

In 2016 Locke represented Graham Spanier in a lawsuit against Louis Freeh which resulted from an investigation Freeh had conducted into the Jerry Sandusky scandal.

In 2019 she represented Sarah Palin in a lawsuit against The New York Times.

In 2019 she defensed Matt Lauer against sexual assault allegations.

In 2020 Locke represented Away in a case against The Verge.

In 2021 she represented Project Veritas in a defamation lawsuit against Stanford University. She also represented Project Veritas against The New York Times.

In 2021 Locke represented ShotSpotter in a defamation lawsuit against Vice Media.

Personal life 
Her father was a businessman and air national guardsman, her mother was a pediatric emergency room nurse and later dog breeder. She has one child with Clare and two from a previous marriage.

She enjoys dressage and gymnastics.

Locke identifies politically as an American conservative.

References 

American lawyers
Living people
American dressage riders
Year of birth missing (living people)